Yuryev-Polsky District is an administrative and municipal district (raion), one of the sixteen in Vladimir Oblast, Russia. It is located in the northwest of the oblast. Its administrative center is the town of Yuryev-Polsky. Population:   39,023 (2002 Census);  The population of the administrative center accounts for 54.1% of the district's total population.

References

Sources

Districts of Vladimir Oblast